Monte Cavo, or less occasionally, "Monte Albano," is the second highest mountain of the complex of the Alban Hills, near Rome, Italy. It is the dominant peak of the Alban Hills. The current name comes from Cabum, an Italic settlement existing on this mountain.

Volcanic activity under King Tullus Hostilius on the site was  reported by Livy in his book of Roman history: "...there had been a shower of stones on the Alban Mount...".

Jupiter Latiaris
Monte Cavo is the sacred Mons Albanus of the Italic people of ancient Italy who lived in Alba Longa (the Albani), and other cities, and therefore a sacred mountain to the Romans; there they built the temple of Jove (Jupiter) Latiaris, one of the most important destinations of pilgrimage for all Latin people in the centuries of Roman domination.
 
On the Mons Albanus, between January and March, the "Latin Festivals" were held. The newly chosen Consuls had to sacrifice to Jupiter Latiaris and to announce the Latin Holidays. When the Consul obtained a victory in war he also had to celebrate the triumph on the Alban Mount. Here in the Latium temple were celebrated every year the Feriae Latinae for four days by the representatives of 47 cities (30 Latin and 17 Federate).

In 531 BC, King Tarquinius Superbus built here a temple shared with the Latins, the Hernici and the Volsci, where every year celebrations in honor of Jupiter Latiaris were held. In return, Jupiter Latiaris conferred upon whoever was elected head of the Latin confederation, the power of dictator latinus.    
A triumphal procession along this sacred way left the Appian Way at Ariccia and climbed up 450 m to the hillside. More than 5 km of this way is well preserved through the woods.

Ancient temple, hermitage, hotel, station
 

The history of the temple of Iuppiter Latiaris was interrupted in the Early Middle Ages, when a hermitage devoted to Saint Peter which replaced the pagan temple was built by a Dalmatian hermit. It  was visited by Pope Pius II in 1463, and subsequently by Pope Alexander VII. After the Dalmatian hermits the Polish religious order of Edmondo of Buisson was established there, then the Trinitarian Spaniards, and finally the Flemish Missionaries.

Then the hermitage was converted to a monastery (1727). The Passionists came in 1758 and restored it in 1783, using the materials of the temple of Jupiter, as found and raised by  Henry Benedict Stuart, Duke of York, bishop of Frascati.

During this period there were guests in the monastery: the king Francis II of Naples in 1865 and Pope Pius IX in  1867. The "contemplative-missionaries" abandoned the monastery in 1889.

In 1890 the structure was converted to a hotel that entertained national and international personalities, among others: Umberto II of Italy, Massimo d'Azeglio, Luigi Pirandello, Armando Diaz (who sojourned in Rocca di Papa and was remembered with a commemorative headstone mail in the residence on De Rossi palace) and the King Edward VIII with his wife Wallis Simpson.

From 1942 the hotel was used as military base for radio communications by the German Wehrmacht. On June 3, 1944, soldiers of 142nd Regiment-36th Infantry Division (United States) ("Texas" Division), attacked and captured the military site—with 20 enemy soldiers killed and 30 prisoners taken.

References

Bibliography
 Strabo - Geographica (Strabo) book V chapter 3 - Rome 20 BC
 Georges Dumézil, Archaic Roman Religion 
 T.J. Cornell - The beginnings of Rome: Italy and Rome from the Bronze Age to Punic War - London 1995 - 
 Livy: Ab urbe condita Book I cap. 31 -Ab Urbe Condita (Latin)
 Dionysius of Halicarnassus: The Roman Antiquities

External links

 Cassius Dio, Roman History (English translation on LacusCurtius)
 English translation of the Roman Antiquities -  Dionysius of Halicarnassus (at LacusCurtius)

Cavo
Italic religion
Ancient Italian history
Archaeological sites in Lazio
Ancient Roman temples
Alba Longa
Cavo